The Logan Henderson Farm, also known as Farmington, is a historic farm house in Murfreesboro, Tennessee, U.S.. Built as a slave plantation in the Antebellum South, it later became a dairy and cattle farm. It is now a horse farm.

History
The house was first built for Logan Henderson and his wife, Margaret Ewart Johnston, in 1816, and extended in 1842. The Johnsons grew cotton and corn; they also raised cattle and swine. They owned 21 slaves in 1820 and 50 slaves in 1840. Upon marrying William F. Lytle, the Hendersons's daughter, Violet, inherited 5 slaves. In 1846, the property was inherited by the Hendersons's son, James Franklin Henderson, who lived there with his wife Amanda and their nine children.

James Franklin Henderson was a Whig, which explains why the house was not destroyed during the American Civil War of 1861–1865. The Hendersons invited both Mrs Braxton Bragg and Mrs William Starke Rosecrans, the spouses of Confederate and Union generals.

The house was purchased by Henry Pfeil in 1897. When his daughter married William A. Snell, the couple turned it into a dairy farm. In 1966, it was acquired by Price Harrison, who raised Angus cattle. By 2003, it had become a horse farm.

Architectural significance
The house was designed in the Greek Revival architectural style. It has been listed on the National Register of Historic Places since September 25, 2003.

References

1816 establishments in Tennessee
Houses on the National Register of Historic Places in Tennessee
Greek Revival architecture in Tennessee
Houses completed in 1816
Buildings and structures in Murfreesboro, Tennessee
Horse farms in Tennessee
Antebellum South